True North is the eleventh studio album by Norwegian heavy metal band Borknagar. It was released on 27 September 2019 by Century Media Records. It is their first album without Andreas Hedlund since Quintessence.

Critical Reception

Loudwire named it one of the 50 best metal albums of 2019.

Track listing

Personnel 

Borknagar
 ICS Vortex – lead vocals, choirs, bass guitar
 Lars "Lazare" Nedland – lead vocals, choirs, keyboards, synthesizer
 Øystein G. Brun – guitar, additional photography; mixing and mastering (tracks 10 and 11)
 Bjørn Dugstad Rønnow – drums, percussion
 Jostein Thomassen – guitar

Additional musicians
 John Ryan – violin and cello (tracks 1, 5, 9)

Production
 Jens Bogren – mixing (tracks 1–9), mastering 
 Marius Strand – recording and engineering (drums)

Artwork
 Thor Erik Dullum – photography (cover art)
 Marcelo Vasco – layout, graphic design
 Christophe Szpajdel – logo

Charts

References 

2019 albums
Borknagar albums
Century Media Records albums